The San Jose Grizzlies were a professional indoor soccer team based in San Jose, California. The team was founded on November 24, 1993, and played in the Continental Indoor Soccer League (CISL). After playing in the 1994 and 1995 CISL seasons, the Grizzlies folded in February 1996. The team played at San Jose Arena, which they shared with the San Jose Sharks, and had an average attendance of 3,712 across both seasons.

Notable players

 Preki (1994–95)
 Bernie Lilavois (1994–95)
 Randy Prescott (1994)
 Rich Ryerson (1994–95)
 Stan Stamenkovic (1994)
 Kevin Hundelt (1994)
 Neathan Gibson (1994)
 Alberto Cruz (1994)
 Jeff Baicher (1995)
 Troy Dayak (1995)
 Rhett Harty (1995)
 Thompson Usiyan (1995)
 Nikola Vignjevic (1995)

Year-by-year

Honors
CISL MVP
 1995 Preki

References

Association football clubs established in 1993
Association football clubs disestablished in 1995
Defunct indoor soccer clubs in the United States
Continental Indoor Soccer League teams
Soccer clubs in California
G
1993 establishments in California
1995 disestablishments in California